APOPO (an acronym for Anti-Persoonsmijnen Ontmijnende Product Ontwikkeling: "Anti-Personnel Landmines Detection Product Development" in English) is a registered Belgian non-governmental organisation and US non-profit which trains southern giant pouched rats to detect landmines and tuberculosis. They call their trained rats 'HeroRATs'.

History

APOPO started as an R&D organization in Belgium in the 1990s, working with the support of research and government grants to develop the concept of Detection Rats Technology. As a pet owner, Bart Weetjens, one of the co-founders, came across an article about gerbils being used as scent detectors. He believed that rats, with their strong sense of smell and ability to be trained, could provide a better means to detect landmines. Weetjens's former university lecturer Prof. Mic Billet, the founder of the Institute for Product Development at Antwerp University, fully supported the idea and made his personal resources available for further investigation and promotion of the new initiative. After consulting with Professor Ron Verhagen, rodent expert at the department of evolutionary biology of the University of Antwerp, the Gambian pouched rat was determined to be the best candidate due to its longevity and African origin. The APOPO project was launched on 1 November 1997 by Bart Weetjens and his former schoolmate Christophe Cox. Both Weetjens and Cox had previously collaborated in a not-for-profit organisation that had been headed by Prof. Mic Billet, and together they started building a kennel facility for the training and breeding of African giant pouched rats. They contacted the Sokoine University of Agriculture (SUA) in Morogoro, Tanzania, and placed an order for the import of Gambian pouched rats.

Initial financial support came in 1997 from Belgian government foreign development aid funds. In 2000 it moved its training and headquarters to SUA, partnering with the Tanzanian People's Defence Force.

In 2003 APOPO was awarded a grant from the World Bank, which provided seed funding to research another application of the rats: tuberculosis (TB) detection at SUA. Weetjens got a three-year personal grant from Ashoka: Innovators for the Public in 2007. A TB detection program in Tanzania was launched in mid-2007 as a partnership with four government clinics. In 2008 proof of principle was provided in using trained rats to detect pulmonary tuberculosis in human sputum samples. In 2010 a research plan to evaluate the effectiveness and implementation of the rats in diagnosing tuberculosis was started. The same year APOPO developed an automated training cage in order to remove human bias. The rats' response is measured by optical sensors and the cage produces an automated click sound with food delivery.

Following results in Tanzania, the TB detection program was replicated in 2013 at a clinic in Maputo, Mozambique, at the veterinary department of the Eduardo Mondlane University. In 2014, in partnership with the Central Tuberculosis Reference Laboratory, the National Institute of Medical Research and the Center for Infectious Disease Research in Zambia, a study undertaken to determine the accuracy of the rats in a population of presumptive TB patients. In 2014 five additional health centres joined the TB detection programme in Maputo. In 2016 APOPO covered almost 100% of all the suspect TB patients who go to clinics in the city, and the TB detection program in Tanzania had expanded to 28 clinics in three areas and processed around 800 samples per week.

After the first 11 rats were given accreditation according to International Mine Action Standards in 2004, beginning in 2006 machinery for ground preparation, manual deminers and the rats assisted with detection in long-running mine clearance operations in Mozambique. Tasked in 2008 as the sole operator to clear Gaza Province, the province was mine-free in 2012, one year ahead of schedule. In 2013 the government allowed APOPO to expand its operations in Maputo, Manica, Sofaka and Tete provinces. Mozambique was officially declared free of all landmines on 17 September 2015. APOPO assisted the government with clearing five provinces. Sixteen rats were maintained in the country at the request of the government in order to carry out residual (mop-up) tasks.

In Angola APOPO has worked for Norwegian People's Aid since 2012. From 2013-2015 up to 31 rats assisted demining by heavy machinery and people with metal detectors at two sites, Ngola-Luije in Malanje and in Malele in Zaire province, bordering the Democratic Republic of Congo. 49 hectares were cleared. The  Malele site was cleared one year in advance. In 2016 rats assisted clearance at a site in Ndondele Mpasi, Zaire province.

In early 2014 the national Cambodia Mine Action Centre (CMAC) started demining a site, with the help of Norwegian Peoples Aid, using conventional mine clearance methods. Following a six-month acclimatization and training period, 14 out of the 16 rats were accredited by CMAC in November 2015 to be used in mine clearance operations. Two Cambodian handlers spent six months in the training centre in Tanzania. By June 2016 the first minefield was cleared. In 2017 a visitor centre was opened in Siem Reap.

Organization
APOPO operational headquarters, including the training and research centers, are based at the Sokoine University of Agriculture in Morogoro, Tanzania. It has field offices for its mine action programmes in Mozambique, Angola and Cambodia as of 2016. The TB programmes are operational in Tanzania and Mozambique, with offices based in Morogoro, Dar es Salaam and Maputo. It has also two fundraising offices in Switzerland and in the United States, and an administrative support office in Antwerp (Belgium).

An APOPO foundation was established in Geneva in 2015 to support APOPO's global activities with financial resources, networking among mine clearance and tuberculosis stakeholders, and increasing visibility. An office was set up in the United States to better access important institutional donors and public funding. The U.S. office was registered as a 501(c)(3) tax exempt non-profit organization in 2015, which enables public and corporation donations to be tax deductible. In 2014 APOPO set up a TB Scientific Advisory Committee to provide credibility. APOPO also has a research and development centre.

As of June 2016, APOPO employed over 190 staff in the local operations and 14 international staff, and had 260 rats in various stages of breeding, detection training, research, or operations.

Scent detection training
Full training takes approximately nine months on average, and is followed by a series of accreditation tests. Once trained, rats are able to work for approximately four to five years before they get retired. All of the rats are bred and trained in the Morogoro breeding and training centre. One rat costs approximately 6,000 euros to train.

Training starts with socialization at the age of 5–6 weeks and then through the principles of 'operant conditioning'. After two weeks they learn to associate a "click" sound with a food reward – banana or peanuts. Once they know that "click" means food, the rats are ready to be trained on a target scent. According to the type of specialization, a series of training stages are followed, each one building on skills learned in the previous stage. The complexity of their tasks gradually increases until they have to do a final blind test. Rats that fail the test are retired and are cared for the rest of their life.

Detecting landmines
When the southern giant pouched rats (Cricetomys ansorgei) used by APOPO are flown in, they must first be acclimatised to the specific country, and be accredited by the local national agency, which takes a number of months.

Rats are only a component of integrated demining operations. Metal detectors and mechanical demining machines are also still necessary. Before the rats can be used, the land must first be prepared with special heavy machinery to cut the brush to ground level. Paths must also be cleared by conventional metal detectors at every 2m intervals for the handlers to safely walk on.

The rats wear harnesses connected to a rope suspended between two handlers. Rats are led to search a demarcated zone of 10 x 20m and indicate the scent of explosives usually by scratching at the ground. The points indicated by the rats are marked, and then followed up later by technicians using metal detectors; the mines that are found are then excavated by hand and destroyed.

Advantages
According to the NGO the main advantage over conventional methods is speed. They point to past studies that show that less than 3 percent of landmine suspected land actually contains any landmines. Animals such as dogs or rats detect only explosives and ignore scrap metal such as old coins, nuts and bolts etc., thus they are able to check areas of land faster than conventional methods. They claim that one rat can check  in around 20 minutes. In Angola, however, from 2012 to 2016  were cleared as part of a team including conventional equipment, indicating a 35,000% slower rate in the field.

The rats are indigenous to Sub-Saharan Africa, so are suited to tropical climates and could be resistant to many endemic diseases. Few resources are needed to train and raise a rat to adulthood and they have a lifespan of six to eight years. Furthermore, rats do not form bonds with specific trainers like dogs but rather are motivated to work for food, so trained rats can be transferred between handlers. In the minefields, the rats are too light to detonate a pressure-activated mine when walking over it. Their small size also means that the rats can be more easily transported to sites than dogs.

Criticisms and limitations
It was noted that rats cannot search reliably in areas of thick vegetation and often search more erratically than humans, offering a lower level of assurance that the land is mine-free. Additionally, they can only work for short periods in the heat, limiting their output. Manual demining teams are still the globally preferred method of landmine clearance, and currently APOPO is the only organisation in the world to use giant rats.

Detecting tuberculosis
Sputum samples that have already been conventionally tested are retested by the rats. The rats sniff a series of holes in a glass chamber, under which sputum samples are placed. When a rat detects tuberculosis (TB), it indicates this by keeping its nose in the sample hole and/or scratching at the floor of the cage. The program began in Tanzania in 2007, double-checking samples from four government clinics, by 2016 some 1000 samples a week were sent by 24 clinics in and around Dar es Salaam and Morogoro. The rats have been screening samples from clinics in Mozambique since 2013. APOPO have a facility at the Eduardo Mondlane University in Maputo. In 2015 14 health centres in the city worked with it.

The key advantage of the rats is speed. Public clinics use microscopy to detect TB; this is slow and imprecise. In Mozambique only 50% of TB positive patients tested at clinics are actually identified, so the rats are used to double check the samples. According to the NGO, one trained rat can evaluate 40 samples in 7 minutes, which a laboratory technician can process in a day. The rats make it possible to mass-screen many samples. They work at low cost and a fast pace.

APOPO suggests it increased the detection of TB patients by over 40%.

In 2015 the rats screened more than 40,000 sputum samples, thereby identifying over 1,150 positive samples that were missed by microscopy.

APOPO assisted Maputo DOTS public health clinics increase TB detection rate by 48% and contributed to halting 3,800 potential TB infections. Over 9,166 presumptive TB patients evaluated by the rats in 2015, 666 missed by conventional methods were diagnosed.

In 2015 APOPO began a study with the support of the USAID, screening prisoners in Tanzanian and Mozambican jails for tuberculosis. This study aimed to convince decision makers of the rats' use.

In 2015 to 2016 more than 2,500 prisoners were to be tested for TB in Mozambique and Tanzania.

Fundraising
APOPO has been funded by the Belgian, Flemish, Norwegian and Liechtenstein  governments, the Polish government, the United Nations Development Programme, the National Institutes of Health, USAID, HDIF, the European Union, the Province of Antwerp, the World Bank, the UBS Optimus Foundation, Trafigura Group, JTIF, the Skoll Foundation, Only The Brave Foundation and the lotteries from Sweden, the UK and Holland. It also receives money from private donors and public fundraising campaigns.

Awards
 2016 : ranked 16th in the Global Geneva Top 500 NGOs.
 2015 : ranked 24th in the Global Geneva Top 500 NGOs.
 2013 : ranked 11th on the 'Top 100 NGO's' Global Journal's list. The organization is also featured in the top three lists for the best NGOs in terms of innovation and in the peace-building sector.
 2013 : received the first level of "C2E" (committed to excellence) accreditation from the EFQM.
 2020 : Magawa, a giant pouched rat trained by APOPO, received the PDSA Gold Medal for detecting unexploded ordnance in Cambodia.

See also
Giant pouched rat - genus
Mine clearance agencies

References

External links
 APOPO website
 The Giant Rats That Save Lives
 The Landmine-Sniffing Rats of Mozambique
 Mankind's new best friend?: Trained giant rats sniff out land mines, tuberculosis
Detecting Tuberculosis: No Microscopes, Just Rats
Rats to the rescue
 TED Talk by Bart Weetjens

Mine warfare and mine clearance organizations
Working animals
Mine warfare countermeasures
Tuberculosis organizations
Organizations established in 1997
Organisations based in Tanzania
Non-governmental organizations
Non-profit organizations based in Africa